Lisa Suhair Majaj (born 1960) is a Palestinian-American poet and scholar. Born in Hawarden, Iowa, Majaj was raised in Jordan.  She earned a B.A. in English literature from American University of Beirut and an M.A. in English Literature, an M.A. in American Culture and a PhD in American Culture from the University of Michigan. In 2001, she moved to Nicosia, Cyprus. Her poetry and essays have been widely published. In 2008, she was awarded the Del Sol Press Annual Poetry Prize for her poetry manuscript Geographies of Light. "In difficult times, poets and writers have always provided lifelines."

Works
Going Global: The Transnational Reception of Third World Women Writers (Garland, 2000) 
Intersections: Gender, Nation and Community in Arab Women's Novels (Syracuse University Press, 2002)
These Words (chapbook, 2003)
Etel Adnan: Critical Essays on the Arab American Writer and Artist (McFarland Publishing, 2002)
Geographies of Light, 2009
Guidlines - by Lisa Suhair Majaj

References

External links
 Lisa Suhair Majaj, Institute for Middle East Understanding
 Naomi Shihab Nye reads and discusses Lisa Suhair Majaj's "Guidelines" 

Living people
American writers of Palestinian descent
American poets
University of Michigan alumni
American women poets
1960 births
21st-century American poets
21st-century American women writers

https://www.encyclopedia.com/arts/educational-magazines/majaj-lisa-suhair-1960